{{Speciesbox
| image = Dactyloscopus tridigitatus - pone.0010676.g139.png
| status = LC
| status_system = IUCN3.1
| status_ref = 
| taxon = Dactyloscopus tridigitatus
| authority = T. N. Gill, 1859
| synonyms =
 Cokeridia kathetostoma J. de P. Carvalho, 1957
 Dactyloscopus kathetostomus (J. de P. Carvalho, 1957)
 Paragillelus macropoma J. de P. Carvalho & S. Y. Pinto, 1965
 Tamandareia oliveirai J. de P. Carvalho & S. Y. Pinto, 1965
}}Dactyloscopus tridigitatus'', the sand stargazer, is a species of sand stargazer native to the Atlantic coasts of the Americas from Florida, United States to Brazil as well as in the Caribbean Ocean and the Gulf of Mexico. It is an ambush predator, burying itself nearly completely in the sand and attacking prey animals that happen by. It can reach a maximum length of  TL.

References

External links
 Photograph

tridigitatus
Taxa named by Theodore Gill
Fish described in 1859